Sloan Township is a township in Woodbury County, Iowa, USA.

History
Sloan Township was organized in 1876.

References

Townships in Woodbury County, Iowa
Townships in Iowa
Populated places established in 1876
1876 establishments in Iowa